D. S. Ramanathan (Tamil: டி. எஸ். ராமநாதன்) was a Malaysian politician, mayor, teacher, unionist , Malayan Army and educationist of Ceylonese origin. He was a member as well as chairman of the Labour Party of Malaya, and subsequently joined the Malaysian Indian Congress. Besides that, Ramanathan also served as the first mayor for the city of George Town, and is credited for his pioneering efforts to set up a university in Penang. The idea of a university in Penang was first mooted by him in 1959 in the State Assembly and later crystallised when he was nominated chairman of the Penang University Project committee.

The Universiti Sains Malaysia opened in 1969 and is today one of the leading tertiary institutions of learning in Malaysia

Early life
D. S. Ramanathan was born to Sri Lanka Tamil family. He later married to  Ruth Vanniasingham. D.S Ramanathan work as teacher on early days before joining politics. The former teacher, who began his career in Perak, was the president of the National Union of Teachers from 1959 to 1962 as well as vice-president of the Malayan Teachers National Congress from 1961-1962.

During that period, he was also an active member of the National Joint Council of Teachers. Even, after finishing his term as mayor, he was appointed as the headmaster of the Penang Pykett Methodist School. He died in 1973 in Kuala Lumpur.

Memorials

D. S. Ramanathan Road
Scott Road, a small road off Air Rajah Road, has been renamed in honour of Ramanathan.

References

Malaysian people of Indian descent
1973 deaths
Malaysian trade unionists
Malaysian people of Sri Lankan Tamil descent
Malaysian politicians of Tamil descent
Malaysian Christians
Malaysian socialists
Malaysian political party founders
Labour Party of Malaya politicians
Members of the Penang State Legislative Assembly
1908 births